Occitan cuisine is the traditional cuisine and gastronomy of Occitania, the supranational region where Occitan is traditionally spoken.

Introduction
Occitan cuisine is a kind of Mediterranean cuisine, very close to Catalan cuisine in the west and to Italian cuisine in the east. This is due not only to the great breadth of Occitania, which goes from the Atlantic Ocean, to the South of France and to the Mediterranean Sea, but to its great geographic diversity as well, the latter whereof grants Occitan cuisine many different kinds of ingredients and dishes adapted to differing localities.

As with other Mediterranean cuisines, it has basic ingredients with strong flavors, such as garlic, olives, salted fish, olive oil and wine, but it also shares some characteristics with Atlantic cuisines, such as the use of cheese and butter. Some of its specialties are well known around the Mediterranean, where they exist in exactly the same form, otherwise with little variation — for example, bolhabaissa, alhòli, ratatolha, and pan golçat (bread with garlic), with emphasis on fines herbes. Other specialties include caçolet, pastís de treflas, aligòt, farcidures (potato and meat dumpling), freginat (fricassee of pork), clafotís, flaunharda, and garbure.

References

Bibliography
La cuina del país dels càtars: Cultura i plats d'Occitània, Jaume Fàbrega, Cossetània Edicions, 2003. 
Mémoires paysannes, Jean Anglade, Éditions de Borée, 2003,

External links

 La cuina del país dels càtars de Jaume Fàbrega
Occitan cuisine and some recipes
Cargolade, Occitan and catalan cuisine

 
French cuisine by region
Mediterranean cuisine
Occitania